The Scuola del Teatro Stabile di Torino, located in Turin, Italy, is a performing arts academy which was founded in 1955 by Italian director Luca Ronconi. Teatro Stabile di Torino (Union of the Theatres of Europe) is recognized as one of the most prestigious Performing Arts Academies around Europe.

Since its early foundation, the Academy has distinguished itself as a national reference center for traditional theatrical heritage, experimentation and research. With the advent of arts and music reform, the Academy became part of the sector level Higher Education in Art and Music (AFAM), established by Law No. 508 of 21 December 1999.

The academic year begins in October and ends in June. The coursework is intensive, requiring motivation and commitment. It includes lessons, exercises and testing, ten hours per day, six days a week. The two main courses, directing and acting, both approach the interpretation of dramatic text using theoretical, critical, technical and artistic analysis. The prestige of the Academy has been firmly established through the participation of important figures in the dramatic arts, who contribute to lesson programs, seminars, special courses and meetings. This allows the film and theater students to make distinctions between the teaching and professional work. Academic activities are presented to the public with the production of approximately two events per year, produced with the students, supported and directed by renowned professionals, including technical staff in set, costume, and lighting design.

The Academy provides training in dramatic theater and the Italian cinema, and is structured in three stages. After completing the three-year program, students are granted a diploma equivalent to a university degree.

Art schools in Italy
Schools of the performing arts
Schools in Turin
1955 establishments in Italy